Nick Bobeck (born June 7, 1980) is an American football coach, who formerly served as the head football coach at the University of Central Oklahoma, and Navarro College, a junior college in Texas. In 2008, Bobeck received the NJCAA Coach of the Year honors after leading the Bulldogs to a 10–1 record. Bobeck's team followed that up two years later with the 2010 NJCAA National Football Championship.

Early life and education
Bobeck grew up in Beaver, Oklahoma. He attended Beaver High School and after graduating in 1999 was offered a football scholarship to the University of Central Oklahoma to play fullback. He wore number 45, since retired. Despite lettering all four years at Central Oklahoma, his first carry was in his second to last game, a 2-yard touchdown run against rival Northeastern State, en route to being named first team All-Lone Star Conference North Division in 2002.

Bobeck earned his bachelor's degree in education in 2003 and his master's degree in sports administration in 2005 from the University of Central Oklahoma.

Coaching career

Early positions
After graduation from Central Oklahoma, Bobeck served as an assistant coach for three years under then-head coach Chuck Langston. He also coached at Texas A&M University in 2006 as the offensive line coach. In 2007, he took a position as the offensive coordinator at Navarro College.

Navarro College
In 2008 Bobeck was promoted to head coach to replace Ray Woodard, who became the head coach at Lamar University. After the 2008 season, Bobeck was named the NJCAA National Football Coach of the Year. During his tenure at Navarro, Bobeck led the Bulldogs to a 42–5 record and the 2010 NJCAA National Championship. Bobeck was inducted to the Navarro College athletic hall of fame in 2021.

Central Oklahoma
On January 4, 2012, Bobeck was hired at his alma mater, Central Oklahoma, as the team's head coach. His first season at the helm was also the first season the Bronchos were a member of the Mid-America Intercollegiate Athletics Association. In the 2012 and 2013 seasons, the Bronchos played only a conference slate and finished with identical 2-8 records. In 2014, the Bronchos were picked 10th and 11th in the conference. However, the team played well above expectations and finished with an 8-4 record and an 8-3 conference record, earning the program's first bid to the Mineral Water Bowl. In 2015 the Bronchos participated in the Live United Texarkana Bowl winning over SWOSU. In 2017 and 2018 the Bronchos won bowl games over Tarleton State and Angelo State. The Bronchos couldn't reach that level of success again under Bobeck. After the 2021 season, Bobeck resigned.

Personal life
Bobeck and his wife Keely, an assistant coach for the Central Oklahoma softball program, have a son and a daughter.

Head coaching record

College

References

External links
 Central Oklahoma profile

1980 births
Living people
American football fullbacks
Central Oklahoma Bronchos football players
Central Oklahoma Bronchos football coaches
Texas A&M Aggies football coaches
Navarro Bulldogs football coaches
People from Beaver County, Oklahoma
Coaches of American football from Oklahoma
Players of American football from Oklahoma